Jon D. Brien is a Democratic former member of the Rhode Island House of Representatives representing the state's District 50 for constituents in Woonsocket and was first elected on November 7, 2006.  He is married and has two daughters.

Brien was Chair of the Rhode Island House Municipal Government Committee, Member of the Rhode Island House Judiciary Committee, and Chair of the Rhode Island House Commission to Study Municipal Financial Integrity.  Brien ran to replace Patrick J. Kennedy in the U.S. House of Representatives for Rhode Island's 1st congressional district after he vacated his seat. Brien was also a legislative member of the American Legislative Exchange Council (ALEC).

Brien is an attorney in private practice and is a partner in Brien & Brien, LLP.  He is a member of the Rhode Island Bar Association, the New York Bar Association, and a former Chairman of Woonsocket Planning Board.

References 

Members of the Rhode Island House of Representatives
Living people
Year of birth missing (living people)
Place of birth missing (living people)